Kwaku Karikari (born 25 March 2002) is a Ghanaian footballer who currently plays as a forward for Serbian First League side Jedinstvo Ub.

Early life 
Karikari was born and bred in Obuasi, a mining community in the Ashanti Region of Ghana. He played for lower-tier side Charity Stars before being poached by Ghana Premier League side Liberty Professionals, where he was assigned to the club's youth team before his promotion into the senior team in October 2020.

Career 
Karikari started his senior career with Liberty Professionals in October 2020. He made his debut on 22 November 2020, after coming on in the 65th minute for Razak Boame in a 2–2 draw against Elmina Sharks. In the process he scored his first competitive goal by scoring an equalizer in the 89th minute via a Emmanuel Paga assist help them salvage an away draw.

On 7 February 2021, he scored a goal that earned Liberty a 1–0 victory against his native Ashanti Gold. The win ended their six-game winless run. On 10 April 2021, he scored Liberty Professionals third goal by scoring from the spot-kick in their 4–0 victory over Elmina Sharks.

Within the season, he scored winning goals against Eleven Wonders and Karela United to help Liberty to victories and keep their relegation fight alive. In both matches he was adjudged the man of the match.

At the end of the 2020–21 season, he scored 7 goals and made 2 assists in 32 league appearances, ending the season as the club's joint top goal scorer with Abraham Wayo.

References

External links 
 

Living people
2002 births
Association football forwards
Ghanaian footballers
Liberty Professionals F.C. players
Ghana Premier League players
Charity Stars F.C. players
Dreams F.C. (Ghana) players
FK Jedinstvo Ub players
Serbian First League players
Expatriate footballers in Serbia
Ghanaian expatriate sportspeople in Serbia